Ann Henderson may refer to:
Ann Henderson (sculptor) (1921–1976), Scottish sculptor
Ann Henderson (politician) (1941–2002), Australian politician
Ann Henderson (campaigner), Scottish labour campaigner and rector of the University of Edinburgh
Anne Henderson (author) (born 1949), Australian writer
Anne Henderson (public servant), chair of the Parades Commission of Northern Ireland
Annie Henderson, I Know Why the Caged Bird Sings character

See also
Ann Henderson-Sellers (born 1952), Australian professor of environment and geography